The 1951–52 Detroit Red Wings season was the Red Wings' 26th season. The highlight of the Red Wings season was winning the Stanley Cup.

Offseason

Regular season

Final standings

Record vs. opponents

Schedule and results

Playoffs

Stanley Cup Final

Detroit wins best-of-seven series 4 games to none

Roster
Terry Sawchuk, Bob Goldham, Benny Woit, Red Kelly, Leo Reise, Marcel Pronovost, Ted Lindsay, Tony Leswick, Gordie Howe, Metro Prystai, Marty Pavelich, Sid Abel (captain), Glen Skov, Alex Delvecchio, John Wilson, Vic Stasiuk, Larry Zeidel, Jack Adams (manager), Tommy Ivan (coach), Carl Mattson (trainer)

Player statistics

Regular season
Scoring

Goaltending

Playoffs
Scoring

Goaltending

Note: GP = Games played; G = Goals; A = Assists; Pts = Points; +/- = Plus-minus PIM = Penalty minutes; PPG = Power-play goals; SHG = Short-handed goals; GWG = Game-winning goals;
      MIN = Minutes played; W = Wins; L = Losses; T = Ties; GA = Goals against; GAA = Goals-against average;  SO = Shutouts;

Awards and records

Transactions

References
 Red Wings on Hockey Database

Detroit
Detroit
Detroit Red Wings seasons
Stanley Cup championship seasons
Detroit Red Wings
Detroit Red Wings